Ford is a hamlet about 6 miles from Stoke Fleming, in the civil parish of Chivelstone, in the South Hams district, in the county of Devon, England. Ford contains around a dozen houses and has a ruined chapel. In 1870-72 it had a population of 64.

History 
Ford was recorded in the Domesday Book as Forde/Forda. Ford was also known as "Ford juxta Alington".

References

External links 

Hamlets in Devon
Villages in South Hams